The 2015 Australian Mixed Doubles Curling Championships was held from October 1 to 4, 2015 at the Naseby Curling Club in Naseby, New Zealand. The winners of this championship were represent Australia at the 2016 World Mixed Doubles Curling Championship.

At the same time 2015 Junior, Mixed Doubles, and Senior Australian National Championships were held at the Naseby Curling Club.

Event format
Four teams fought it out in a double round robin best of five games format with wins and losses counting from the round robin.

The stylish wonder team made up of juniors Dean Hewitt and Kristen Tsourlenes were on fire in their first couple of games scoring wins from more experienced teams demonstrating the future talent of Australia.

At the end of the double round robin, teams were ranked from 1 to 4. Ian Palangio and Laurie Weeden ranked first with a record of 5 wins and 1 loss qualifying them for the Sunday morning gold medal game. Teams Hugh Millikin/Kim Forge and Dean Hewitt/Kristen Tsourlenes tied for second and were forced into a tie breaker game late on Saturday night to determine the final ranking for second and third place.

This competition marked the first opportunity for three new rules to be implemented at a Mixed Doubles nationals for Australia. The new rules included:
 the Power Plan option mentioned above, 
 a change in the placement of the rock in the house from the back of the button to now be at the back of the 4 foot ring, and
 no requirement for somebody to hold a broom, allowing teams to have the option for a sweeper with shots delivered.

General comments from players indicate they like the new rules as it makes the game more interesting to play, more scenarios, and greater mix of shots during the game.

Teams
The teams are listed as follows:

Round-robin standings

Tiebreaker

Playoffs

Bronze-medal match

Gold-medal match

Final standings

References

2015 in curling
2015 in Australian sport
Australian Mixed Doubles Curling Championships
Australian Mixed Doubles Curling
2015 in New Zealand sport